The Apricot PC (originally called the ACT Apricot) is a personal computer produced by Apricot Computers, then still known as Applied Computer Techniques or ACT. Released in late 1983, it was ACT's first independently developed microcomputer, following on from the company's role of marketing and selling the ACT Sirius 1, and was described as "the first 16-bit system to be Sirius-compatible, rather than IBM-compatible", indicating the influence that the Sirius 1 had in the United Kingdom at the time.

It achieved success in the United Kingdom, with reviewers noting the system's high resolution  display (for its time) and its trackball cable (later models used IR).

A 8087 math co-processor was optional. It came with a CRT green-screen 9" with text mode  or graphics  and was equipped with two floppy discs and a keyboard with an integrated LCD display.

The Apricot Xi was a similar computer released in 1984, with a hard drive instead of a second floppy-drive.

Software 
Due to an IBM PC incompatible BIOS, trying to run a software package like dBase III would result in a system crash.

IBM PC compatibility 
The manufacturer did not completely clone the IBM BIOS, so although it ran MS-DOS and CP/M-86, it was not IBM PC compatible as the underlying system BIOS and hardware was very different. An Intel 8089 I/O controller was used, instead of the Intel 8237 DMA chip used in IBM computers; the ROM was only a simple boot loader rather than a full BIOS; and there was no 640k barrier. The floppy disk format was "not quite compatible"; attempting to read an ordinary PC FAT floppy in an Apricot, or vice versa, would result in a scrambled directory listing with some files missing.

Apricot later offered the possibility of converting the computer into an IBM compatible PC by replacing the motherboard with one equipped with an Intel 80286 processor.

Technical data
 Processor: Intel 8086 . Socket for optional Intel 8087 co-processor.
 BIOS: 2 × EPROM containing the BIOS
 DMA chip: Intel 8089
 Graphics: Comes with a green phosphor screen 9" that weights . Can display one of these modes:
 Text 80 × 25 (Characters of 10 × 16 pixels)
 Text 132 × 50 (Characters of 6 × 8 pixels)
 Graphics at 800 × 400 (Hitachi 46505 CRT controller chip - equivalent to a Motorola 6845, also used on the Victor 9000 computer)
 Mechanical Keyboard 101-key QWERTY, 8 function keys and 6 keys standard dynamic membrane with an LED to the left of each one to indicate they are active. An LCD with 40 × 2 characters is included, which can display the key assignment. Weighs  and can be attached to the frame underneath for easy transport.
 Housing:  plastic cream weighing about 6.4 kg The front half of the top shows a depression to bring the monitor. In the front two 3.5" floppy drives that can be protected with a shutter for transport. Under these, a carrying handle. At the rear two proprietary Apricot connector slots for expansion, parallel printer port of Centronics micro ribbon 36 pin connector type, serial port DB-25 connector, monitor connector and power supply with a switch.
 Support for two internal 3,5" Sony floppy disk drives
 Input / Output:
 External monitor connector.
 Parallel printer port, Centronics micro ribbon 36-pin connector
 RS-232 serial port
 Two expansion connectors or internal Apricot
 Operating system came with standard MS-DOS 2.11 and CP/M-86.

References

External links 
 ACT Apricot PC at old-computers.com
 ACT Apricot Technical Reference Manual ACT Apricot Technical Reference Manual (WordStar), retrieved 18 July 2006
 ACT Apricot PC Brochure at classic.technology

Apricot Computers